The Lobster is a 2015 absurdist black comedy drama film directed and co-produced by Yorgos Lanthimos, from a screenplay by Lanthimos and Efthimis Filippou. It stars Colin Farrell, Rachel Weisz, Jessica Barden, Olivia Colman, Ashley Jensen, Ariane Labed, Angeliki Papoulia, John C. Reilly, Léa Seydoux, Michael Smiley, and Ben Whishaw. In the film, newly single bachelor David moves into a hotel with other singletons, who are all obliged to find a romantic partner in 45 days, or else be transformed into animals.

The Lobster was announced in October 2013, with confirmation that Jason Clarke would star as the lead. After Clarke left production, Farrell replaced him by February 2014, with Weisz also joining the cast instead of Elizabeth Olsen. The rest of the cast was rounded out by that March as principal photography began, which concluded that May. Filming largely took place in Ireland, including in Dublin and across County Kerry. The film is a co-production by Ireland, the United Kingdom, Greece, France, and the Netherlands. 

Selected to compete for the Palme d'Or at the 2015 Cannes Film Festival, winning the Jury Prize, The Lobster was theatrically released first in the United Kingdom in October 2015, grossing $18 million worldwide. The film received positive reviews from critics, with praise for its screenplay, humor, and thematic content, and was nominated for Best Original Screenplay at the 89th Academy Awards and for Outstanding British Film at the 69th British Academy Film Awards.

Plot

David is escorted to a hotel after his wife leaves him for another man. The hotel manager reveals that single people have 45 days to find a partner or they will be transformed into an animal of their choice (the dog accompanying David is his brother Bob). David is set on becoming a lobster, should he fail. David makes the acquaintance of Robert, a man with a lisp, and John, a man with a limp. Guests are fixated on finding a mate with whom they share superficial traits such as minor ailments, which they believe to be the key to compatibility.

The hotel has many rules and rituals: masturbation is banned, but sexual stimulation by the hotel maid is mandatory, and guests attend dances and watch propaganda extolling the advantages of partnership. Residents can extend their deadline by hunting and tranquilizing the single people who live in the forest; each captured "loner" earns them one day. On the way to a hunt, a woman with a fondness for butter biscuits offers David sexual favours, which he declines. She tells him that if she fails to find a mate, she will kill herself by jumping from a hotel window.

John wins the affections of a woman with constant nosebleeds by purposely smashing his nose in secret. They move to the couples' section to begin a month-long trial partnership. David later decides to court a notoriously cruel woman who has tranquilized more loners than anyone else. Their initial conversation is accompanied by the screams of the biscuit-loving woman, who has injured herself by jumping from a first floor window. David pretends to enjoy the woman's suffering to gain the heartless woman's interest. He later joins her in a hottub where she feigns choking on an olive to test him. Noticing that he makes no attempt to help her, she decides that they are a match, and the two are shifted to the couples' suite. David wakes up one morning and finds she has killed his brother. As David tearfully mourns him, she concludes that their relationship is a lie and attempts to drag him to the hotel manager to have him punished, turned into the "animal that no one wants to be". However, he escapes and, with the help of a sympathetic maid (who is later revealed to be a mole working for the loners), tranquilizes his partner and transforms her into an unspecified animal.

David escapes the hotel and joins the loners in the woods. In contrast to the hotel, they forbid any kind of romance, which is punishable by mutilation. David, who is short-sighted, begins a secret relationship with a woman who is also short-sighted. They develop a gestural language they use to communicate. They are taken on covert missions to the nearby city, where their cover requires them to appear as husband and wife, which they secretly enjoy.

The loners launch a raid to sabotage the hotel. David tells the woman with nosebleeds that John has been faking his. Other loners hold the hotel manager and her husband at gunpoint, tricking him into shooting his wife to save himself, but the gun is not loaded. They leave the couple to face each other.

The leader of the loners obtains David's journal and discovers his plan to escape with the short-sighted woman. The leader and the maid take the woman to the city, ostensibly to have an operation to cure her short-sightedness, but instead has her blinded. The woman attempts to stab the leader, but the leader uses the maid as a human shield and pretends to die when the woman stabs the maid to death.  David and the woman try to find something else that they have in common, to no avail. One morning, David overpowers the leader, leaving her tied up in an open grave to be eaten alive by wild dogs. He and the blind woman escape to the city and stop at a restaurant. David goes to the restroom and hesitantly prepares to blind himself with a steak knife.

Cast

Production
Principal photography began on 24 March 2014, and concluded on 9 May 2014. Filming took place in Dublin, Ireland, which represents "The City" in the film, and also at locations in and around County Kerry, including Sneem, Dromore Woods and Kenmare. The hotel used was the Parknasilla Resort and Spa hotel, near Sneem.

Casting 
It was originally reported on 23 October 2013 that Jason Clarke would lead the cast, with support from Ben Whishaw, Léa Seydoux, Olivia Colman, Ariane Labed, and Angeliki Papoulia. Clarke dropped out of the film due to scheduling conflicts with Everest, and on 3 February it was announced that Colin Farrell and Rachel Weisz would star in The Lobster. Elizabeth Olsen was approached to star in the film, but turned down the offer due to her commitments with Marvel Studios for Avengers: Age of Ultron. She later wondered to what entirely different path the movie could have taken her acting career, but ultimately felt that she took the right decision. Shortly after principal photography began, John C. Reilly and Ashley Jensen joined the cast on 31 March 2014.

Release
In May 2014, it was announced that Sony Pictures Releasing acquired the distribution rights for Australia, New Zealand, Germany, Scandinavia, Russia, Eastern Europe, and Latin America. A film still featuring Farrell, Whishaw, and Reilly was released around the same time. The film's posters were designed by Vasilis Marmatakis, with the Colin Farrell one sheet version considered by professional poster designer Adrian Curry to be the 2nd best poster of the 2010s.

In May 2015, Alchemy acquired United States distribution rights; however, due to the company's financial struggles at the time, A24 acquired the US rights instead. Originally scheduled for an 11 March 2016 release, it was rescheduled to 13 May 2016.

Reception

Critical response
On Rotten Tomatoes, the film has an approval rating of 87% based on reviews from 263 critics, with an average rating of 7.5/10. The website's critical consensus reads, "As strange as it is thrillingly ambitious, The Lobster is definitely an acquired taste — but for viewers with the fortitude to crack through Yorgos Lanthimos' offbeat sensibilities, it should prove a savory cinematic treat". On Metacritic, which assigns a weighted average score out of 100 to reviews from mainstream critics, the film received an average score of 82, based on 44 reviews, indicating "universal acclaim".

Oliver Lyttelton of The Playlist awarded the film an "A" grade and described it as "an atypically rich and substantial comedy" with "an uproarious yet deadpan satire concerning societal constructs, dating mores and power structures that also manages to be a surprisingly moving, gloriously weird love story". He concluded that the film was Lanthimos' "most accessible and purely enjoyable film yet". Chris Nashawaty of Entertainment Weekly gave a positive review and commended the film for being "visually stunning, narratively bold, and totally singular", adding that "it opens [one's] eyes to a new way of storytelling".

Guy Lodge, writing for Variety, called the film "a wickedly funny, unexpectedly moving satire of couple-fixated society", elaborating that Lanthimos' "confounding setup emerges as a brilliant allegory for the increasingly superficial systems of contemporary courtship, including the like-for-like algorithms of online dating sites and the hot-or-not snap judgments of Tinder".

Peter Bradshaw of The Guardian rated the film three stars out of five, and wrote that The Lobster is "elegant and eccentric in Lanthimos' familiar style", but "appears to run out of ideas at its mid-way point". Similarly, reviews in the Cleveland Plain Dealer and the Vancouver Sun judged the film unable to sustain itself across its full runtime. IGN awarded it a score of 8.5 out of 10, saying "Colin Farrell heads up this surreal, hilarious and ultimately quite disturbing tale."

Wai Chee Dimock, writing in the Los Angeles Review of Books, called The Lobster a "fable of purgatory" and compared the film to the work of Samuel Beckett, saying that, for this all-Greek team, "absurdist theater is second nature, as it was second nature to the Irish Beckett a century ago".

Timothy Laurie and Hannah Stark, writing in the New Review of Film and Television Studies, praise The Lobster as "both a satire of compulsory coupling and an equally damning critique of libertarian individualism as an alternative to domestic monogamy".

Accolades

References

External links

 
 
 
 
 

2015 black comedy films
2015 films
2015 romantic comedy-drama films
2010s science fiction thriller films
A24 (company) films
British black comedy films
British romantic comedy-drama films
British satirical films
British science fiction thriller films
British comedy thriller films
2010s comedy thriller films
Dutch romantic comedy-drama films
Dutch satirical films
Dutch thriller films
Dystopian films
English-language Dutch films
English-language French films
English-language Greek films
English-language Irish films
Films about blind people
Films about shapeshifting
Films directed by Yorgos Lanthimos
Films set in hotels
Films shot in Ireland
French black comedy films
French romantic comedy-drama films
French satirical films
French science fiction television series
Georges Delerue Award winners
Greek romantic comedy-drama films
Greek satirical films
Greek speculative fiction films
Greek thriller films
Irish romantic comedy-drama films
Irish satirical films
Irish science fiction films
Irish thriller films
Films about self-harm
2015 comedy films
2010s English-language films
2010s American films
2010s British films
2010s French films